Ofotens Bilruter is a bus company based in Narvik, Norway, that operates schedules services in Ofoten. Owned by TIRB, it is part of Hurtigruten Group, and operates on contract with Nordland County Municipality. This includes the city buses in Narvik, regional buses in Ofoten, and Airport Express Coach branded buses to Harstad/Narvik Airport, Evenes and NOR-WAY Bussekspress branded buses to Bodø.

History
The company was founded on 7 April 1938 to conduct transport on the newly opened road from Narvik to Harstad. In 1941 it started the route Narvik–Fauske–Bodø in cooperating with Saltens Bilruter. In 1947 the company extended the service to Fauske to include routes to the Nordland Line, which had opened to Lønsdal Station.

References

Bus companies of Nordland
Companies based in Narvik
Transport companies established in 1938
Norwegian companies established in 1938